Club Bàsquet Martorell, also known as BC Martorell Solvin for sponsorship reasons, is a Spanish basketball team based in Martorell, Catalonia, that currently plays in Liga EBA.

History
CB Martorell was founded in 1975 after several attempts to create a team in the city.

In 2014, after several failures in promotion play-offs, the club was admitted in Liga EBA thanks to an expansion of the Group C. One year later, Martorell signed a collaboration agreement with Liga ACB team Bàsquet Manresa.

Finally, on 22 May 2017, Martorell promoted to LEB Plata by winning the final stage played in Villaviciosa de Odón.

Season by season

References

External links
Official website
Profile at FEB.es

Basketball teams established in 1975
Catalan basketball teams
Former LEB Plata teams
Liga EBA teams
1975 establishments in Spain